Irene Dingel (born April 26, 1956 in Werdohl, Germany) is a German historian and a Protestant theologian.

Irene Dingel studied Protestant theology and Romance studies in Heidelberg and Paris. From 1981 until 1982 she was an "Élève à titre étranger" at the École Normale Supérieure (ENS) de Fontenay-aux-Roses, and she also worked as an editor at the same time. Between 1982 and 1993 she was a scientific assistant at the theological faculty of Heidelberg University, where she also received several research grants. In 1986 she finished her doctorate in Heidelberg, which was followed by her habilitation in 1993. After that Dingel was a substitute professor and then a professor of historical theology at the Goethe University Frankfurt until 1998). Since 1998 she has held the chair of ecclesiastical history and the history of dogma at the faculty of Protestant history of the Johannes Gutenberg University Mainz. In addition, Dingel became the head of the Leibniz Institute of European History in Mainz in 2005, as director of the Department of Western Religious History.

Dingel is a member of different academic boards and associations, including:
 Member of the Academy of Sciences and Literature
 Board member of the Verein für Reformationsgeschichte
 Member of the Academic Advisory Commission "Evangelische Kirchenordnungen des 16. Jahrhunderts" of the Heidelberg Academy of Sciences and Humanities
 Member of the Inter-Academy Management Committee of the Leibniz-Edition
 Member of the Academic Advisory Council of the "Interdisziplinäres Institut für Kulturgeschichte der Frühen Neuzeit (IKFN)" at the University of Osnabrück
 Member of the University Council of the Johannes Gutenberg University Mainz

Since February 2012 Dingel is also a member of the German Council of Science and Humanities. On June 27, 2015 she was awarded the "Hermann-Sasse-Preis" of the Independent Evangelical-Lutheran Church.

Dingel's research interests are the history of the Reformation and of the Confessionalization. Besides that she's also engaged in the research of the early Enlightenment in Western Europe.

Publications 
Monographs (selection)
 Concordia controversa. Die öffentlichen Diskussionen um das lutherische Konkordienwerk am Ende des 16. Jahrhunderts, Gütersloh 1996 (Quellen und Forschungen zur Reformationsgeschichte 63), .
 Beobachtungen zur Entwicklung des französischen Vokabulars: Petit Larousse 1968 – Petit Larousse 1981, Frankfurt/M. 1987 (Heidelberger Beiträge zur Romanistik 21), .
 Reformation. Zentren – Akteure – Ereignisse, Göttingen 2016, .
 Robert Kolb, Irene Dingel, L’ubomír Batka (Hg.), The Oxford Handbook of Martin Luther’s Theology, Oxford 2014.
 Irene Dingel und Christiane Tietz (Hg.), Säkularisierung und Religion. Europäische Wechselwirkungen, Göttingen 2019,  (Veröffentlichungen des Instituts für Europäische Geschichte Mainz. Abt. für Abendländische Religionsgeschichte, Beiheft 123).

As editor (selection)
 with Christiane Tietz: Das Friedenspotenzial von Religion, Mainz 2009 (Veröffentlichungen des Instituts für Europäische Geschichte Mainz, Beiheft 78), .
 with Matthias Schnettger: Auf dem Weg nach Europa. Deutungen, Visionen, Wirklichkeiten, Göttingen 2010 (Veröffentlichungen des Instituts für Europäische Geschichte Mainz, Beiheft 82), .
 with Christiane Tietz: Die politische Aufgabe von Religion. Perspektiven der drei monotheistischen Religionen, Mainz 2011, .
 Die Bekenntnisschriften der Evangelisch-Lutherischen Kirche. Vollständige Neuedition, Göttingen 2014, .
 Die Bekenntnisschriften der Evangelisch-Lutherischen Kirche. Quellen und Materialien., Bd. I-II, Göttingen 2014,  und .
 Abraham Mangon, Kurze doch wahrhafftige Beschreibung der Geschichte der Reformierten in Frankfurt. 1554–1712, Leipzig 2004, .
 with Henning P. Jürgens: Meilensteine der Reformation. Schlüsseldokumente der frühen Wirksamkeit Martin Luthers, Gütersloh 2014, .
 with Armin Kohnle: Gute Ordnung. Ordnungsmodelle und Ordnungsvorstellungen in der Reformationszeit, Leipzig 2014, .
 with Robert Kolb and L’ubomír Batka: The Oxford Handbook of Martin Luther’s Theology, Oxford 2014, .
 with Volker Leppin: Das Reformatorenlexikon, Darmstadt 2014, .
 with Heinz Duchhardt: Die europäische Integration und die Kirchen II: Denker und Querdenker, Göttingen 2012, .
 with Matthias Schnettger: Auf dem Weg nach Europa. Deutungen, Visionen, Wirklichkeiten, Göttingen 2010, .
 with Heinrich Assel: Verkündigung und Forschung, theological journal.
 with Joachim Bahlcke: Die Reformierten in Schlesien. Vom 16. Jahrhundert bis zur Altpreußischen Union von 1817, Göttingen 2016 (VIEG Beih. 106), .
 Memoria – theologische Synthese – Autoritätenkonflikt. Die Rezeption Luthers und Melanchthons in der Schülergeneration, Tübingen 2016 (Spätmittelalter, Humanismus, Reformation 90), .
 with Henning P. Jürgens: Auf den Spuren der Reformation in Rheinland-Pfalz, Petersberg 2017, .
  Schriftenreihe Controversia et Confessio. Theologische Kontroversen 1548–1577/80, Göttingen. 
 with Johannes Paulmann: European History Online

References

External links 
 
 Irene Dingel at the Leibniz Institute of European History
 Website of Irene Dingel at the Johannes Gutenberg University Mainz
 Irene Dingel at the Academy of Sciences and Literature
 Irene Dingel at AcademiaNet
 Long-term research and editorial project "Controversia et Confessio"
 EGO | European History Online

Academic staff of Johannes Gutenberg University Mainz
Living people
1956 births
20th-century German historians
21st-century German historians
Academic staff of Goethe University Frankfurt